Mariamme was a city in the late Roman province of Syria I, corresponding to present-day Qal'at El-Hosn or Krak des Chevaliers.

The bishopric of Mariamme is no longer a residential episcopal see and is therefore included in the Catholic Church's list of titular sees.

The first titular bishop was appointed to the see in 1923 in the person of Martín Rucker Sotomayor, who had been named the Apostolic Vicar for the Vicariate Apostolic of Tarapacá in Chile. 

The current holder of the title is Claudiu-Lucian Pop, a curial bishop of the Romanian Greek Catholic Church.

References

Catholic titular sees in Asia